Ahamadpur is a village in located in Mant Tehsil of Mathura district, Uttar Pradesh, India. The village belongs to Agra Division.

Geography 
This village is located near to Bajna township. Pin code of village is 281201.

Politics
Mant (Assembly constituency) is the Vidhan Sabha constituency. Mathura (Lok Sabha constituency) is the parliamentary constituency.

References
 

Villages in Mathura district